Eric Albarracin (born c. 1983), sometimes known by his nickname Captain Eric, is a retired American wrestler who won silver medals in the freestyle 54 kg division at the Pan American Championships and at the Military World Wrestling Championships. Currently he coaches professional mixed martial arts competitors from Brazil, and in this capacity participated in The Ultimate Fighter: Brazil 2 and The Ultimate Fighter: Brazil 3. Before that Albarracin trained the Olympic champion and the former UFC Flyweight & Bantamweight Champion Henry Cejudo. Albarracin also trains UFC Middleweight contender Paulo Costa.

Albarracin is a former U.S. Army officer, and was the Officer-in-Charge of Modern Army Combatives, a hand-to-hand combat system.

References

External links
 

Living people
Sportspeople from New York (state)
American male sport wrestlers
1982 births